"Leave Me Alone" is a pop rock song written by Josh Alexander, Jessica Origliasso, Lisa Origliasso and Billy Steinberg, produced by Alexander and Steinberg for The Veronicas' debut album The Secret Life of... (2005).

The single debuted at number seventy on the ARIA charts. It eventually reached a higher position of number forty-one. "Leave Me Alone" was released as the fifth and final single from The Secret Life of... and coincided with the release of their live album, Exposed... The Secret Life of The Veronicas on 2 December. No music video was produced for the release of the single.

Track listing
"Leave Me Alone" – 3:32
"4ever" (Claude Le Gache mixshow) – 5:43
"Everything I'm Not" (Eddie Baez mix – edit) – 4:29

Charts

References

2006 singles
The Veronicas songs
Songs written by Billy Steinberg
Songs written by Josh Alexander
Songs written by Jessica Origliasso
Songs written by Lisa Origliasso
2005 songs
Sire Records singles
Song recordings produced by Billy Steinberg